Hamilton is an unincorporated community in Perry Township in Jefferson County, Pennsylvania, United States.

History
A post office has been in operation at Hamilton since 1852. Robert Hamilton was the first postmaster.

References

Unincorporated communities in Jefferson County, Pennsylvania
Unincorporated communities in Pennsylvania